Peter Schnittger (born 22 May 1941) is a German football coach who has managed a number of national teams throughout Africa and Asia, including Ivory Coast, Cameroon, Ethiopia, Thailand, Madagascar, Benin and Senegal. In 2006 he rejected an approach from the Algerian Football Federation to coach their national side.

Whilst coaching the Cameroonian national team, he also coached local club side Léopard Douala.

References

External links

 Peter Schnittger Interview
 

1941 births
Living people
German football managers
Expatriate football managers in Ivory Coast
Ivory Coast national football team managers
Expatriate football managers in Cameroon
Cameroon national football team managers
Expatriate football managers in Ethiopia
Ethiopia national football team managers
Expatriate football managers in Thailand
Thailand national football team managers
Expatriate football managers in Madagascar
Madagascar national football team managers
Expatriate football managers in Benin
Benin national football team managers
Expatriate football managers in Senegal
Senegal national football team managers
People from Hann. Münden
Sportspeople from Lower Saxony
2000 African Cup of Nations managers
1970 African Cup of Nations managers
1972 African Cup of Nations managers
1976 African Cup of Nations managers
West German expatriate sportspeople in Cameroon
German expatriate sportspeople in Benin
German expatriate sportspeople in Senegal
West German expatriate sportspeople in Madagascar
West German expatriate sportspeople in Thailand
West German expatriate sportspeople in Ethiopia
West German expatriate sportspeople in Ivory Coast
West German football managers
West German expatriate football managers
West German expatriate sportspeople in Morocco